Michael J. Smith, known as Mike Smith (22 September 1935 – 22 April 2013) was an English professional footballer who played as a centre half. Active between 1956 and 1966, Smith made over 150 appearances in the Football League for two clubs.

Career
Born in Quarndon, Smith played for Derby County, Bradford City, Crewton Sports and Lockheed Leamington. For Bradford City, he made 134 appearances in the Football League; he also made 2 FA Cup appearances.

Later life and death
Smith died on 22 April 2013, at the age of 77.

Sources

References

1935 births
2013 deaths
People from Quarndon
Footballers from Derbyshire
English footballers
Association football defenders
Derby County F.C. players
Bradford City A.F.C. players
Leamington F.C. players
English Football League players